Tangga is an Oceanic language of New Ireland, spoken on Tanga and Feni islands and in Sena, Muliama and Varangansau villages in the Tanglamet area of Namatanai of New Ireland itself. These three locations are highly divergent; children from one understand little to nothing of the others, and adults consider them to be distinct languages, though they recognize their common history of  their migration from Tanga and Feni to New Ireland.

References

Languages of New Ireland Province
St George linkage